Futom-e Sofla (also Romanized as Fūtom-e Soflá; also known as Fūtam-e Pā’īn, Pā’īn Fūtam, and Pā’īn Fūtom) is a village in Hasan Reza Rural District, in the Central District of Juybar County, Mazandaran Province, Iran. At the 2006 census, its population was 110, in 29 families.

References 

Populated places in Juybar County